Transportes Moctezuma de La Laguna (previously Transportes de la Laguna) is a Torreón City, Coahuila, Mexico Bus Line. In 2006, Transportes Moctezuma had 119 buses. Their buses are green.

In 2017, due to customer complaints, the Department of Transportation confiscated 46 audio devices from public transportation vehicles to reduce noise.

Routes
Torreón-Gómez-Cumbres
Gómez-Lerdo
Nucleo
Directo
Aldama-Cereso
Vergel
Santa Rosa
Hamburgo

See also 
Transportes del Nazas

Bus companies of Mexico

References